Mount Parry is a mountain in Stribog Mountains, Antarctica (within the claims of the United Kingdom, Argentina and Chile.) with an elevation of . Mount Parry rises eastward of Minot Point and dominates the central portion of Brabant Island, in the Palmer Archipelago. It has steep and partly ice-free north and west slopes, and surmounts Djerassi Glacier to the north-northwest, Mackenzie Glacier to the east, Balanstra Glacier to the south-southeast and Pirogov Glacier to the southwest.

Mount Parry was first ascended by the British Joint Services Expedition led by John Furse on 30 October 1984.

Etymology
The peak appears to have been named by Captain Henry Foster, Royal Navy, of the Chanticleer expedition in 1829 and since has gained international usage.

Maps
 Antarctic Digital Database (ADD). Scale 1:250000 topographic map of Antarctica. Scientific Committee on Antarctic Research (SCAR), 1993–2016.
British Antarctic Territory. Scale 1:200000 topographic map. DOS 610 Series, Sheet W 64 62. Directorate of Overseas Surveys, Tolworth, UK, 1980.
Brabant Island to Argentine Islands. Scale 1:250000 topographic map. British Antarctic Survey, 2008.

Gallery

See also
List of Ultras of Antarctica
Stribog Mountains
Brabant Island

Further reading 
 Damien Gildea, Antarctic Peninsula - Mountaineering in Antarctica: Travel Guide
 William James Mills, Exploring Polar Frontiers: A Historical Encyclopedia, P 99

External links 

 Mount Parry on USGS website
 Mount Parry on SCAR website
 Mount Parry on peakbagger website 
 Mount Parry on mountain-forecast website

References

Mountains of the Palmer Archipelago